Anne Savisa Boonchuy (Thai: แอนน์ สาวิสา บุญช่วย) is the main protagonist of the Disney Channel animated series Amphibia, created by Matt Braly. She is voiced by Brenda Song. The character debuted in the pilot, "Anne or Beast?" and made her last appearance in the series finale, "The Hardest Thing". Anne is a Thai-American teenage human girl who, on her 13th birthday, is magically displaced to Amphibia alongside her friends Sasha and Marcy by a mysterious music box known as the Calamity Box. Upon her arrival, an anthropomorphic family of frogs called the Plantars find her and over time they form a bond. She is also  discovered by the town of Wartwood who reluctantly let her stay with them.

Anne has been well-received by both critics and fan of the series, who praised her character, Song's performance, and her coming of age evolution through the series.

Creation

According to Matt Braly, he wanted Anne to have a similar arc to Gravity Falls character Pacifica Northwest, as he felt that "to have this character change so drastically was so rewarding, and that's why [he] knew [he] wanted [his] own show to have some of that element as well". Anne, along with her best friends, Sasha and Marcy, were originally fifteen-years-old because they wanted the series to have a high school-like feel, but were aged down to thirteen in order to appeal to the series' target demographic; due to this, the trio often realizes actions more akin to high school students, such as driving and having part-time jobs. Matt Braly revealed on an AMA that Anne's design was slightly influenced by Pepper Ann, as Braly was a fan of the series.

Early concept art by James Turner depicted Anne with a lighter skin tone, blue hair, and casual wear from the start. Later concept art by Joe Sparrow showed that Anne was going to have a much rougher hairstyle and have a more boring personality on Earth. She was also shown to be wearing many styles of clothing, including a SJMS jacket and longer shirt. In the show's pilot, Amphibiland, Anne was originally going to sport both of her shoes (the other one being broken) when being transported to Amphibia. Anne's original character was originally envisioned as being a boring person on Earth, before being reinvented by the crew.

On March 27, 2019, it was revealed that Brenda Song would star in the series as the voice of Anne. According to Braly, Song ad-libbed several jokes during recording.

Thai representation
Anne is best known for being the first Thai-American lead in a animated show. Braly, who is also Thai-American, chose to make her Thai-American because he wanted more Thai characters in television series. According to Braly, Anne was loosely inspired by his grandmother when she was young. He described Anne being Thai-American as "a number one priority", as he wanted Thai-American kids to see themselves reflected on television. Season 3, which is set on Earth, further delves into Anne's Thai heritage, including an episode set at a Wat Thai temple in Los Angeles. Braly described the temple's representation in the episode as "pretty accurate", as it is important for him to represent Thai culture accurately.

Anne's last name, Boonchuy (Thai: บุญช่วย), roughly translates to "one who encourages or performs good deeds" in the Thai language. This fits her character as she always attempts to help the people of Wartwood and improve herself. Her middle name, Savisa, is named after Braly's cousin, Savisa Bhumiratana.

Character

Design
Anne is a tall, slender girl of Thai descent. She has tan skin and short, messy brown hair which, before coming to Amphibia, looked relatively the same. It has leaves and a twig sticking out on top as a sign of her having lived there for so long. After returning to earth, she got rid of all leaves and twigs, but got new leaves and twigs shortly after returning to Amphibia.

Anne usually wears her school uniform consisting of a mauve skirt and undershirt and a light blue-gray shirt with her school's coat of arms on it. She wears white socks, but only one yellow-and-white sneaker, having lost the other one some time before meeting the Plantars; the other sneaker is now in the possession of Captain Grime.

Personality
Anne is described as fearless, egocentric, and rebellious, as shown in the second segment of the first episode, where she and Sprig defy Hop Pop's orders to stay put and instead go to the lake to swim. Anne is shown to have a zany side; a good example is her interactions with Sprig and anyone else she is really close to. She is also very energetic, which has got her both in and out of trouble. Anne started off as a slightly conceited girl who nevertheless embraced her ethnic roots. Anne is a pop culture enthusiast with a love for young-adult movies and TV shows. Like most teenagers, Anne is obsessed with her phone, often watching shows and playing games on it. In spite of her recklessness, Anne can often deliver good advice. This is seen in both "Grubhog Day", where she advises Sprig to tell Hop Pop that he doesn't want to take care of the grubhog, and "Cursed!", where she tells Sprig to just break his engagement with Maddie due to his fear of her.

Over the course of the first season, Anne displays bouts of homesickness and imprints her hobbies on the Plantars, such as her love of pizza, her pet cat Domino, her TV habits, her obsession with couples, her restaurateur abilities and her dancing prowess.

According to Matt Braly, Anne reads manga, "[probably saw] anime", and watched The Lord of the Rings. This is further supported in the episode "Trip to the Archives", where Anne shouts "Zoobooks and manga, here I come!".

Fictional character biography

Background
Anne lived with her parents in Los Angeles, California and was best friends with two girls named Sasha Waybright and Marcy Wu. On her 13th birthday, she is peer-pressured into stealing a mysterious music box that magically transports her and her friends, Sasha and Marcy to the world of Amphibia, a wild marshland tropical island full of anthropomorphic amphibians and threatening creatures, where they are separated from each other.

Season One
After living in the jungle for two weeks, she is found by Sprig Plantar and quickly befriends him. She is discovered by the rest of the Plantars and the town of Wartwood who reluctantly let her stay with them. While slightly angsty around the Plantars at first, she realizes that they want to care for her and does her best to please them, especially Sprig who she has a lot in common with. She lives in their basement which is prone to flooding. Over time, Anne grows to love the family as her own and does not wish any harm come to them, While the Wartwood citizens openly mock her at first, they slowly warm up to her and accept her as one of them after she protects them from debt collector Toads that the Mayor had cheated. After the Wartwood citizens throw a celebration for her, Anne is reunited with Sasha who she learns is in league with the Toad Warriors.
 Anne eventually comes to the realization that Sasha had been manipulative of her throughout their friendship and is forced to fight her. They become separated afterward, with Anne becoming distraught over losing her but promising to make things right with her in the future.

Season Two
Anne and the Plantars leave Wartwood to find answers to how Anne came to Amphibia and how she can get back. They arrive in Newtopia where Anne is happily reunited with Marcy. She was initially protective of her due to her clumsiness but has now accepted that she can take care of herself. Anne is shown to be slightly jealous of Marcy's intelligence but realized that she was better at being socially interactive than her. While in Newtopia, Anne comes to grips with the fact that she misses her mother most of all and that she would want to be with her more than anything in the world. Together with Marcy, they come to accept that despite her genuinely caring about them, Sasha had always looked down on them to a degree. However, they will get her back regardless. Upon discovering that the Calamity Box has lost its power and needs to be recharged (it was left back in Wartwood), Anne becomes solemn over leaving the Plantars, and upon seeing this Marcy lets her to go back with them so they can retrieve the box together and meet up at the first temple. Upon returning to Wartwood, Anne reveals that she is a practitioner of Muay Thai, due to her mother's insistence.[24] She finds out about Hop Pop lying to her about the Calamity Box and becomes angered. When she learns that Hop Pop's fears are related to the death of Sprig and Polly's parents, she forgives him, but admits that she needs time to herself. She later successfully completes the second temple by not only admitting to being dishonest, such as lying about stealing the Calamity Box, but also proving her courageousness in the face of danger. However, she only partially charges her gem as the blue hue in her eyes had not fully been filtered out and her gem begins to flicker. Afterwards, she reunites with Sasha, though she reluctantly accepts her help with the third temple. When Anne discovers Andrias' true intentions with the Calamity Box, she becomes determined to stop him and unleashes her inert blue energy that allows her to fight back. She returns home to Los Angeles, along with the Plantars and the head of Frobo.

Season Three
Anne is happily reunited with her parents and introduces them to the Plantars. Her parents note that she has matured significantly and shows a better appreciation for the things they do for her. She even changes her attire upon returning to Earth. While trying to fend off a Cloak-Bot that was sent after her by Andrias, Anne realizes that she still has the blue gem energy within her, though she has decided to deter from using it, as it tires her out. She eventually comes clean to her parents about why and how she returned and while they are upset with her for keeping information from them, but they realize that she was trying to protect them and the Plantars. In "Froggy Little Christmas", Anne anonymously writes a letter to Marcy and Sasha's parents promising to get them home safely.

After donning a similar outfit to what she wore when she first arrived in Amphibia, Anne eventually makes peace with the fact that she will be leaving her parents again to get back to Amphibia. Upon returning, she and the Plantars find Amphibia in ruins. She happily reunites with Sasha. Despite her insistence on taking over the resistance against Andrias, Anne reveals that she now has faith in her to do the right thing. She helps to take down one of the factories. Afterwards, it was noticed that one of her shoes was lost in an earlier incident with a quicksand pit. Anne later comes to terms with the fact that she and Sasha may have directly influenced Marcy's actions that sent them to Amphibia, but learns to forgive her as she had done for Sasha and Hop Pop. Finally knowing who she is and want she wants to do, Anne battles Andrias and defeats him while also freeing Marcy. She returns to Amphibia to announce the Resistance’s victory, only to witness the moon falling towards them.

Realizing that the moon is falling because of the Core, Anne, Sasha and Marcy are imbued with the gem powers to push it back. Unable to do so, Anne absorbs all the gem powers and destroys the moon and the Core, but loses her life in the process. She encounters the Gem Guardian who offers that she replace her as the new guardian, but she turns it down as she is still a teenager and does not have the wisdom to watch over the universe. The entity agrees and revives Anne where she happily reunites with her friends. She has one final goodbye with the Plantars before returning home alongside Sasha and Marcy. Ten years later, Anne has become a herpetologist and works at the Aquarium of the Pacific where she cares for a frog named Sprig.

Reception
Anne's character and Song's performance had received a strong positive reception from both critics, and fans of the show. Pio Nepomuceno from ScreenRant listed her as one of the best characters from Amphibia, stating "like many coming-of-age stories, Anne started as a kind yet irresponsible teen that was eager to please her friends even at her own expense".

Other media
An image of Anne can be seen in The Owl House episode King's Tide at the end when Camila Noceda is cooking with her tablet open to an article that reads "Girl Lost in Frog Land?? HOAX??".

She would later appear in Chibi form in the animated series based on the "Chibi Tiny Tales" shorts, Chibiverse.

See also
List of Amphibia characters

References

Child characters in animated television series
Television characters introduced in 2019
Animated characters introduced in 2019
Animated human characters
Teenage characters in television
Female characters in animated series
Fictional characters who can move at superhuman speeds
Fictional characters with energy-manipulation abilities
Fictional characters with superhuman strength
Fictional clones
Fictional Buddhists
Fictional Thai American people
Fictional characters from Los Angeles
Fictional middle school students
Fictional female sportspeople
Fictional female martial artists
Fictional tennis players
Fictional Muay Thai practitioners
Fictional chefs
Fictional revolutionaries
Fictional female swordfighters
Fictional women soldiers and warriors
Fictional herpetologists
Amphibia (TV series) characters
Fictional characters displaced in other dimensions